The Gießen-Koblenz Lahn Valley is a bowl in western Hesse and eastern Rhineland-Palatinate in Germany that contains the lower course of the Lahn as well as the Limburg Basin. It falls within natural region no. 31 as defined by the BfN. It extends from Leun to the mouth of the Lahn into the river Rhine near Lahnstein. Despite its name it does not reach as far east as Gießen, but ends west of Wetzlar.

Natural divisions 
 310  Lower Lahn Valley  
 311  Limburg Basin 
 311.0 North Limburg Basin Hills
 311.00 Ahlbach Börde Plateau
 311.01 Elz-Hadamar Basin Edge
 311.02 Schupbach-Hof Edge Plateau
 311.1 Inner Limburg Basin
 311.10 Linter Plateau
 311.11 Villmar Basin
 311.12 Runkel Lahn Valley Region
 311.13 Limburg Lahn Valley Region
 311.14 Diezer Pforte
 311.2 South Limburg Basin Hills
 312  Weilburg Lahn Valley Region  
 312.0 Gaudernbach Plateau
 312.1 Weilburg Lahn Valley
 312.11 Löhnberg Valley Region
 312.12 Weilburg-Aumenau Lahn Valley
 312.2 Edelsberg-Braunfels Plateau
 312.21 Braunfels Plateau
 312.22 Edelsberg Plateau

The Gießen-Koblenz Lahn Valley region is the western extension of the Marburg-Gießen Lahn Valley region (major unit 348). It continues to the west into the Moselle Valley (major unit 25), which separates it from the Middle Rhine Region (29). To the north it is bordered by the Westerwald and to the south by the Hintertaunus.

Natural regions of the Central Uplands
Geography of Rhineland-Palatinate
Regions of Hesse